The Graphic Communications International Union (GCIU) was a labor union representing printing workers in the United States and Canada.

The union was founded on May 25, 1983, when the Graphic Arts International Union merged with the International Printing and Graphic Communications Union.  Like both its predecessors, it affiliated to the AFL–CIO.  On formation, it had 154,000 members. This figure fell rapidly, along with employment in the industry, and by 2004, the union had only 60,000 members.

On January 1, 2005, the union merged into the International Brotherhood of Teamsters, becoming its Graphic Communications Conference.

Presidents
1983: Kenneth J. Brown
1985: James J. Norton
2000: George Tedeschi

References

Printing trade unions
Trade unions established in 1983
Trade unions disestablished in 2005